Postplatyptilia nebuloarbustum is a moth of the family Pterophoridae. It is known from Ecuador.

The wingspan is about 20 mm. Adults are on wing in October.

Etymology
The names reflects the conditions of the collecting spot, a high altitude cloud forest.

References

nebuloarbustum
Moths described in 2006